M.N. Jois was born on 14th December 1905 in Mysuru (14th December 1905 – 28 March 2002) was an Indian freedom fighter from Mysore State known as the "Lion of Mysore". Jois took part in various movements to overthrow the British government as a legislator, politician, administrator, and educator.

There is an M.N. Jois Circle in Mysore and the street where he lived is also named after him. He died at the age of 98 years on 28 March 2002.

Describing his childhood and inspiration: "My father Shri. Narayana Jois was a teacher at Mari Mallappa's High School in Mysore. I also studied in the same school. Shri Venkatakrishnaiah, then the Head Master of the school, was better known as 'Tathiah - the Grand Old Man of Mysore'. This title was given to him by none other than Gandhiji in 1926."

References 

Politicians from Mysore
1905 births
2002 deaths
Indian independence activists from Karnataka
20th-century Indian politicians